Guzzo may refer to:

Cinémas Guzzo, a theatre chain in Canada
34716 Guzzo, an asteroid in the Main Asteroid Belt of the Solar System
Sergeant Guzzo, a character in Call of Duty 2: Big Red One and Call of Duty 3
Guzzo (surname), a surname of Italian origin

See also